James or Jim Weaver may refer to:

Politics
 James Weaver (Wisconsin politician) (1800–1886), member of the Wisconsin State Assembly
 James B. Weaver (1833–1912), United States Representative from Iowa and Presidential candidate
 James D. Weaver (1920–2003), United States Representative from Pennsylvania
 Jim Weaver (Oregon politician) (1927–2020), United States Representative from Oregon
 James H. Weaver (Alabama politician), Secretary of State of Alabama, 1856–1860

Sports
 James Weaver (racing driver) (born 1955), British race car driver
 Jim Weaver (athletic director) (1945–2015), director of athletics, most recently at Virginia Tech, previously an American football player and coach
 Jim Weaver (basketball), coach of the Houston Mavericks of the American Basketball Association
 Jim Weaver (left-handed pitcher) (born 1939), Major League Baseball pitcher
 Jim Weaver (outfielder) (born 1959), Major League Baseball outfielder
 Jim Weaver (right-handed pitcher) (1903–1983), Major League Baseball pitcher
 Jim Weaver (sportsperson) (1903–1970), head football coach and athletic director at Wake Forest, commissioner of the Atlantic Coast Conference
 Red Weaver (James Redwick Weaver; 1897–1968), American football player and coach

Other people
 James Weaver (actor), British actor
 James Henry Weaver (1883–1942), American mathematician
 James R.N. Weaver (1888–1967), Commander, Provisional Tank Group, U.S. Army Forces Far East in the Philippines Campaign
 Jim Weaver (chef), chef, author and pioneer in the Slow Food movement